The 2019 United States Tri-Nation Series was the second round of the 2019–2023 ICC Cricket World Cup League 2 cricket tournament and took place in the United States in September 2019. It was a tri-nation series between Namibia, Papua New Guinea and the United States cricket teams, with the matches played as One Day International (ODI) fixtures. The ICC Cricket World Cup League 2 formed part of the qualification pathway to the 2023 Cricket World Cup. It was the first One Day International series to be played in the USA.

Originally, the Church Street Park cricket ground in Morrisville, was named as the host venue by the International Cricket Council. In July 2019, it was announced that either a new venue in Morgan Hill, California or the Leo Magnus Cricket Complex in Woodley Park in Los Angeles would host the tournament. However, the Central Broward Regional Park in Lauderhill, Florida was chosen as the host venue.

The first fixture of the series saw the United States beat Papua New Guinea by five runs via the DLS method in a rain-affected match. This was the first-ever win for the United States in an ODI match.

Squads

Fixtures

1st ODI

2nd ODI

3rd ODI

4th ODI

5th ODI

6th ODI

References

External links
 Series home at ESPN Cricinfo

2019 in American cricket
2019 in Namibian cricket
2019 in Papua New Guinean cricket
International cricket competitions in 2019–20
United States
September 2019 sports events in the United States
2019 in sports in Florida